John Masius (born July 30, 1950) is an American screenwriter. He is a credited for creating the series Touched by an Angel (1994–2003), Providence (1999–2002) and Hawthorne (2009–2011).

Early life 
He graduated from Scarsdale High School.

He earned a bachelor's degree in economics from the Wharton School of the University of Pennsylvania and an MBA from the University of California, Los Angeles (UCLA).

Awards and nominations
Masius has won two writing Emmy Awards for the drama St. Elsewhere. He also received a Writers Guild award and the Humanitas Prize for his writing on St. Elsewhere.

Masius also received The Humanitas Prize for the series Brooklyn Bridge.

Personal
Masius was married to actress Ellen Bry, who was a series regular on St. Elsewhere. They divorced in 1999. They have three children: son Max, daughter Hannah and son Sam.

Filmography

Film

Television

Awards and nominations

References 

1950 births
American television writers
American male television writers
Television producers from New York (state)
People from Scarsdale, New York
Living people
Place of birth missing (living people)
Screenwriters from New York (state)
Wharton School of the University of Pennsylvania alumni
University of California, Los Angeles alumni